Hank Cicalo (born June 25, 1932) is an American recording engineer whose career has spanned over fifty years.  Among the artists recorded by Cicalo are The Monkees, Carole King, Barbra Streisand, and George Harrison.

Early career
In 1957, Cicalo started in the mastering room at Capitol Studios, then progressed to second engineer and worked with many great engineers like John Krause, Hugh Davies, John Palladino, and Pete Abbott.  Some of the artists' albums he worked on were Frank Sinatra, Dean Martin and Nat King Cole. He moved up to engineer while at Capitol and worked with such notables as Cannonball Adderley, Peggy Lee, Ed Ames and Lou Rawls.
 
In 1963, Cicalo began work for RCA Records in Hollywood.  As one of the lead engineers at RCA, he worked with artists including Eddy Arnold, Vic Damone, Ann-Margret, Eddie Fisher, Peter Nero, Duke Ellington, Wayne Newton and Tommy Leonetti.   
 
In the mid-1960s, Cicalo also worked closely with Tom Mack, producer for Dot Records.  Their projects included The Mills Brothers, The Lennon Sisters, Jimmie Rodgers, Glen Campbell, Ernie Andrews, Frankie Carle, and Harry James.  Their biggest project together was Lalo Schifrin's Mission Impossible, for which Cicalo was nominated for his first Grammy Award.

The Monkees
While at RCA Records in Hollywood, California, Cicalo recorded The Monkees for Colgems Records.  In total, he did four albums with the band, including The Monkees, More of The Monkees, Live 1967, and Headquarters. All three studio albums with the group went multi-platinum, each reaching number one on the Billboard charts.

The Monkees' Headquarters album was their first to feature all four band members playing instruments. Lacking experience as a recording group, the sessions dragged out from a normal two or three weeks to a full six weeks. Cicalo worked patiently with the Monkees and their producer Chip Douglas (himself a first-time producer), and the album came together as the band learned about making records. As a thank-you to Cicalo, the Monkees gave him the writing credit for their song "No Time" (included on Headquarters). This briefly got Cicalo into trouble, as RCA had a rule against engineers soliciting songs for recording. When matters were explained, Cicalo was able to collect the writer's royalties (which, he says, was used to buy a house). Released to praise and brisk sales, Headquarters was a huge success.

Cicalo also recorded the scores for the popular Monkees television show and engineered tracks on The Birds, The Bees & The Monkees, Pisces, Aquarius, Capricorn & Jones, Ltd., and Head.  Cicalo toured with the band in 1967 and recalled that the most frightening experience he ever had was being attacked by a mob of teenage girls while in a limousine with The Monkees. Cicalo also engineered Mike Nesmith's first solo album, The Wichita Train Whistle Sings.

Tapestry
In the 1970s, Cicalo went to work for A&M and Ode Records.  He engineered Carole King's landmark Tapestry album. Tapestry was the second solo album for Carole on the Ode label, but the first album Cicalo engineered.   Released in February 1971, Tapestry was number one on the Billboard charts for fifteen consecutive weeks, and held a record for most weeks at number one, 46 consecutive weeks in the top ten.  Cicalo also worked with Carole on Rhymes & Reasons, Fantasy, Wrap Around Joy, Really Rosie, and Thoroughbred.

During the 1970s, Cicalo also continued to do freelance projects.  He worked with George Harrison at his Friar Park recording studio to make Harrison's Thirty-Three & 1/3, and also worked with Barbra Streisand on her ButterFly album.

Later career
The late 1980s and 1990s saw Cicalo back in the studio, recording and mixing albums:  Dreams & Themes by Patrick Williams, Body and Soul and The Groove Shop by Clayton Hamilton Jazz Orchestra, Once More…With Feeling by Doc Severinsen & The Tonight Show Band. In 1995, Cicalo recorded and produced Professional Dreamer by Kenny Rankin; it was a chance for Rankin to record many of his favorite jazz standards.

In 1992, Cicalo recorded the popular children's album, Pure Imagination, by Michael Feinstein. It was the beginning of a collaboration that resulted in several subsequent recordings.  He engineered Isn’t It Romantic, That’s Entertainment, Hugh Martin Songbook, as well as Such Sweet Sorrow, and Nice Work If You Can Get It – which he also co-produced.

Though he had worked with him on earlier projects, Cicalo is particularly proud of Rawls Sings Sinatra, which he recorded with Lou Rawls in 2003.  It was one of the last Lou Rawls projects, and Cicalo enjoyed working with Rawls again, as well as with producer Billy Vera.

Cicalo's most recent album is the two-CD 2008 release: Tapestry – Legacy Edition.

References
The Monkees Tale, Eric Lefcowitz (Last Gasp Press)
Monkeemania! The True Story of the Monkees, Glenn A. Baker, Tom Czarnota & Peter Hogan (St. Martin's Press)

External links

1932 births
American audio engineers
Living people
People from Brooklyn
The Monkees